"Stand by You" is the debut and winner's single by  Marlisa, the series six winner of The X Factor Australia. It was released digitally on 20 October 2014 as the lead single from her self-titled debut album. The song debuted at number two on the ARIA Singles Chart and was certified platinum by the Australian Recording Industry Association for sales exceeding 70,000 copies.

Background and release
"Stand by You" was written by Anthony Egizii, David Musumeci and Hayley Warner. It was also produced by Egizii and Musumeci under their production name DNA. After winning The X Factor, "Stand by You" was released for digital download in Australia on 20 October 2014, as Marlisa's debut and winner's single. The following day, the song was released as a CD single. For the issue dated 27 October 2014, "Stand by You" debuted at number two on the ARIA Singles Chart, with three-day sales of 27,666 copies. Marlisa became the first X Factor winner since Altiyan Childs in 2010 to not debut at number one with her winner's single. In its fifth week, "Stand by You" was certified platinum by the Australian Recording Industry Association for sales exceeding 70,000 copies.

Live performances
Marlisa performed "Stand by You" live for the first time during The X Factor grand final performance show on 19 October 2014. She performed the song again during the grand final decider show the following day, after she was announced as the winner.

Track listing
CD / digital download
 "Stand by You" – 3:12

Charts

Weekly charts

Year-end charts

Certifications

Release history

References

2014 songs
2014 debut singles
Songs written by David Musumeci
Songs written by Anthony Egizii
Songs written by Hayley Warner
Song recordings produced by DNA Songs
Sony Music Australia singles